Lathyrus splendens is a species of wild pea known by the common names pride of California and Campo pea. It is native to Baja California and its range extends into San Diego County, California, where it grows in the chaparral. This is a climbing perennial pea vine with coiling tendrils. Its leaves are each made up of 6 to 8 linear to oval-shaped leaflets a few centimeters long and wavy-margined stipules. The plant produces showy inflorescences of up to 6 bright to deep red flowers each about 3 centimeters wide. The fruit is a hairless dehiscent legume pod.

External links
Calflora Database: Lathyrus splendens (Pride of California)
Jepson Manual eFlora (TJM2) treatment of Lathyrus splendens
USDA Plants Profile for Lathyrus splendens
UC CalPhotos gallery: Lathyrus splendens

splendens
Flora of California
Flora of Baja California
Natural history of the California chaparral and woodlands
Natural history of the Peninsular Ranges
Garden plants of North America